Teitur is a male given name. In Old Norse the word means happy. In Modern Faroese, it is archaic but used as a male given name.

People
Teitur Gestsson (born 1992), Faroese football player and goalkeeper
Teitur Lassen (born 1977), a musical artist from Faroe Islands. 
Teitur Thordarson (born 1952), Icelandic football coach.

External links
Wiktionary entry: Teitur

Given names
Faroese masculine given names
Scandinavian masculine given names